Aethriamanta brevipennis, scarlet marsh hawk, is a species of dragonfly in the family Libellulidae. It is found in many Asian countries.

Subspecies
Three subspecies recognized.
 Aethriamanta brevipennis brevipennis Rambur, 1842 – scarlet marsh hawk
 Aethriamanta brevipennis circumsignata Selys, 1897 – square-spot basker
 Aethriamanta brevipennis subsignata Selys, 1897 – black-headed basker

Description and habitat
It is a small dragonfly with dark reddish-brown eyes. Its thorax is dark chocolate-brown on dorsum and humeral region, paling on sides. Wings are transparent, tinted with deep golden-amber at base. Abdomen and anal appendages are bright red. Female is similar to the male; but greenish-yellow in colors.

It breeds in weedy ponds and lakes.

See also 
 List of odonates of Sri Lanka
 List of odonates of India
 List of odonata of Kerala

References 

 brevipennis.html World Dragonflies
 Animal diversity web
 Query Results

External links

Libellulidae
Insects described in 1842